The 2002 Wismilak International was a women's tennis tournament played on outdoor hard courts in Bali, Indonesia that was part of the Tier III category of the  2002 WTA Tour. It was the eighth edition of the tournament and was held from 23 September through 29 September 2002. Unseeded Svetlana Kuznetsova won the singles title and earned $35,000 first-prize money.

Finals

Singles
  Svetlana Kuznetsova def.  Conchita Martínez, 3–6, 7–6(7–4), 7–5

This was Kuznetsova's second WTA Tour singles title, and her second of the year.

Doubles
  Cara Black /  Virginia Ruano Pascual def.  Svetlana Kuznetsova /  Arantxa Sánchez Vicario, 6–2, 6–3

This was Black's 10th WTA Tour doubles title, and second of the year, and was Pascual's 15th WTA Tour singles title, and sixth of the year. This was their first and only WTA Tour title won together as a pair.

Singles main draw entrants

Seeds 

Rankings are as of 16 September 2002.

Other entrants 
The following players received wildcards into the singles main draw:
  Gala León García
  Maria Kirilenko
  Virginie Razzano

The following players received entry from the qualifying draw:
  Kelly Liggan
  Akiko Morigami
  Antonella Serra Zanetti
  Sarah Taylor

The following player received entry as a lucky loser:
  Evie Dominikovic

Withdrawals 
  Mary Pierce → replaced by  Lina Krasnoroutskaya
  Tina Pisnik → replaced by  Alicia Molik
  Angelika Rösch → replaced by  Evie Dominikovic

Doubles main draw entrants

Seeds 

Rankings are as of 10 October 2003

Other entrants
The following pair received wildcards into the doubles main draw:
  Liza Andriyani /  Wukirasih Sawondari

The following pair received entry from the qualifying draw:
  Virginie Razzano /  Silvija Talaja

References

External links
 ITF tournament edition details
 Tournament draws

Wismilak International
Commonwealth Bank Tennis Classic
2002 in Indonesian tennis